The 2009 Tour de Langkawi was the 14th edition of the Tour de Langkawi, a cycling stage race that took place in Malaysia. The race began on 9 February in Putrajaya and ended on 15 February in Dataran Merdeka, Kuala Lumpur. In fact this race was sanctioned by the Union Cycliste Internationale (UCI) as a 2.HC (hors category) race on the 2008–09 UCI Asia Tour calendar.

Colombian cyclist, José Serpa emerged as the winner of the race, followed by Jai Crawford second and Jackson Rodríguez third. Mattia Gavazzi won the points classification category and José Serpa won the mountains classification category.  won the team classification category.

Teams
20 teams accepted invitations to participate in the 2009 Tour de Langkawi. 

 
 
 
 
 
 
 
 
 
 EQA-Meitan Hompo-Graphite Design
 Seoul Cycling Team
 Doha Team
 
 MNCF Cycling Team
 Malaysia ‡
 Australia ‡
 South Africa ‡
 Iran ‡
 Kazakhstan
 China ‡

‡: National teams

Stages
The cyclists competed in 7 stages, covering a distance of 1031.7 kilometres.

Classification leadership

Final standings

General classification

Points classification

Mountains classification

Asian rider classification

Team classification

Asian team classification

References

Tour de Langkawi
2009 in road cycling
2009 in Malaysian sport